This list includes the date of hiring and the performance record of National Basketball Association head coaches. The league consists of 30 teams, of which 29 are located in the United States and one in Canada. In the NBA, a head coach is the highest ranking coach of a coaching staff.

Gregg Popovich has served as head coach of the San Antonio Spurs for 26 years. No other current NBA head coach has been head coach of his current team as long as Popovich has been head coach of the Spurs. Popovich has also coached more games (2,045), won more games (1,344), and lost more games (701) than any other active head coach has with his current team. Miami Heat head coach Erik Spoelstra is the second longest-tenured NBA head coach, having been head coach of the Heat since the 2008–09 season. No active head coaches have been inducted into the Basketball Hall of Fame as coaches. Popovich is the only current head coach to have been hired by his current team in the 1990s.

As of February 26, 2023, 13 coaches have spent their entire NBA head coaching careers with their current teams: Gregg Popovich with the San Antonio Spurs, Erik Spoelstra with the Miami Heat, Steve Kerr with the Golden State Warriors, Nick Nurse with the Toronto Raptors, Taylor Jenkins with the Memphis Grizzlies, Stephen Silas with the Houston Rockets, Mark Daigneault with the Oklahoma City Thunder, Chris Finch with the Minnesota Timberwolves, Joe Mazzulla with the Boston Celtics, Willie Green with the New Orleans Pelicans, Jamahl Mosley with the Orlando Magic, Chauncey Billups with the Portland Trail Blazers, and Wes Unseld Jr. with the Washington Wizards.

Popovich, Spoelstra, Kerr, Nurse and Mike Budenholzer have won NBA championships with their current teams, while Rick Carlisle, Doc Rivers, and Tyronn Lue have won with their former teams.

Key

Coaches

Note: Statistics are correct through the end of the  season.

See also
 NBA Coach of the Year Award
 List of National Basketball Association head coaches with 400 games coached
 List of National Basketball Association player-coaches
 List of NBA championship head coaches
 List of foreign NBA coaches
 Top 10 Coaches in NBA History
 List of female NBA coaches
 List of National Basketball Association general managers
 List of National Basketball Association team presidents

Notes

References
General

  

Specific

External links
 NBA Coaches Association Official Website

National Basketball Association lists
National Basketball Association head coaches